The Windrider walkalong glider is a commercially available toy airplane designed to be flown by controllable slope soaring. The design was first invented, manufactured and sold by Tyler MacCready, son of Paul MacCready. The same design appeared as the Air Surfer from WowWee for a brief period before being produced by the current manufacturer, Windrider Ltd. of Hong Kong. The Windrider is a flying wing design type of fixed-wing aircraft.

See also 

 Gliding
 Orographic lift
 Slope soaring
 controllable slope soaring
 Human-powered aircraft

External links

 Video of Tyler MacCready flying his walkalong glider on Scientific American Frontiers Flying Free episode
 Video on how to fly the Wowwee Air Surfer product
 Windrider Ltd. Flying Toys
 Ballast Modifications to Reduce Stall Speed of Windrider
 PBS Scientific American Frontiers Flying Free episode with Walkalong Glider

Gliding technology
Model aircraft